Mesophleps albilinella is a moth of the family Gelechiidae. It is found in Korea and China (Guizhou, Hebei, Henan, Hubei, Hunan, Shaanxi and Tianjin).

The wingspan is 8–16 mm. The forewings are whitish yellow to ochre, with a dark costal margin. The hindwings are dark grey.

References

Moths described in 1990
Mesophleps
Moths of Japan